Gerald B. H. Solomon Saratoga National Cemetery is a United States National Cemetery located in the village of Schuylerville in Saratoga County, New York. Administered by the United States Department of Veterans Affairs, it encompasses , and as of 2021 had over 23,000 interments.

Location 
The Gerald B.H. Solomon Saratoga National Cemetery is located on Duell Road in the town of Saratoga, New York.  The closest village is Schuylerville, part of the town of Saratoga. The postal address is Stillwater, New York.  The National Cemetery is within a mile of Saratoga National Historical Park's battlefield unit.

History 
Dedicated on July 9, 1999 as Saratoga National Cemetery, it was the 116th National Cemetery. It was renamed to Gerald B. H. Solomon Saratoga National Cemetery on January 24, 2002, in honor of Congressman Gerald B. H. Solomon, who was known for his support of veterans' causes, and who is interred there. During his tenure in the U.S. House of Representatives, he sponsored the legislation which created the Department of Veterans Affairs and secured approval for the creation of the national cemetery now named for him. He served in Congress from 1979 to 1999, and was Chairman of the powerful Rules Committee in the House at the time of his retirement. As of the end of 2005, only the first  were developed for interments.

Notable monuments 

 A pyramidal memorial made of granite, erected in 2002 and dedicated to Congressman Gerald B.H. Solomon.

Notable interments 
 Medal of Honor recipients
 Sergeant Thomas A. Baker, for action in World War II
 Technical Sergeant Peter J. Dalessondro, for action in World War II
 Specialist Four Raymond R. Wright, for action in the Vietnam War
 Others
 Joseph E. Persico, author
 Gerald B. H. Solomon, US Congressman
 Jack Briggs, actor
 Thomas M. Adamson, 1st Sgt. Vietnam 
 Michael Martin Mulholland, SP4. Vietnam. Inventor of House Special Lo-Mein. Section 18 Lot 492

External links 
 National Cemetery Administration
 Gerald B.H. Solomon Saratoga National Cemetery
 
 

United States national cemeteries
Cemeteries in Saratoga County, New York